is a series of books collecting short stories by Hiroyuki Morioka, set in the same universe and involving characters from his novels Crest of the Stars and Banner of the Stars, with many of them originally published in the S-F Magazine. The word Dansho refers to a passage from a written work, but there is currently no consensus on how the title should be translated. One story later included in the 2005 compilation Seikai no Dansho I, "Birth", was made into an anime OVA in 2000, four years after it was  published in the S-F Magazine and 5 years before the consolidation of that story into the 2005 edition.

Plot

Seikai no Danshō consists of short stories involving characters from the world of novels Crest of the Stars and Banner of the Stars.

Media

Books

{{Graphic novel list
 | VolumeNumber    = 3
 | OriginalTitle = 星界の断章III
 | LicensedTitle = 
 | TranslitTitle = Seikai no Dansho III
 | OriginalRelDate = March 20, 2014
 | OriginalISBN    = 978-4150311537
 | ChapterList     = 
'  (with Crest of the Stars DVD Box, May 28, 2010)
 (with Banner of the Stars I DVD Box, June 25, 2010)
 (with Banner of the Stars II/III DVD Box, July 23, 2010)
 (with "Star World Audio Drama CD Book with the Crest of the Stars and Banner of the Stars", March 23, 2011)
 (S-F Magazine, May 2013 issue, March 25, 2013)
 (doujinshi magazine Moon and Star Party, August 2007)
 (S-F Magazine, October 2013 issue, August 25, 2013)
 (newly written)
}}

Anime
A 2000 anime OVA adapted the first published Seikai no Danshō story, "Birth", that was included 5 years later in the 2005 book Seikai no Dansho I. It was released in North America by Bandai Entertainment on the final DVD volume of Banner of the Stars II release in 2003, and in 2013 was re-licensed by Funimation for a 2018 release with the Crest of the Stars DVD collection. It was also included in Crest of The Stars and Banner of the Stars Blu-ray collection, released in Japan on December 25, 2019.

Radio drama
"Contact", "Original Sin", "Annexation" and "Childhood Friend" adaptations were broadcast in 2006 by FM Osaka internet radio. "Original Sin" was the last work of the Seikai series starring Hirotaka Suzuoki, who died the same year.

CD Drama 
"Birth" was released as a CD drama in 2001 ahead of the radio broadcast. It was later included in the Banner of the Stars II radio drama CD-BOX (First Limited Edition) released in 2006 as an appendix along with the 5th episode "Childhood Prank". Also, the third episode "Blessing" was released as an appendix to the Crest of the Stars CD-BOX, the fourth episode "Ball Games" as an appendix to the Banner of the Stars CD-BOX, and the sixth episode "Jealousy" in Banner of the Stars III CD-BOX appendix. All of the above dramas were broadcast in 2006 after the end of the radio drama Banner of the Stars IV on FM Osaka. On February 23, 2011, "Contact", "Original Sin", "Annexation", "Childhood Friend" were released as "Star World Audio Drama CD Book with the Crest of the Stars and Banner of the Stars''". For Bandai Namco Arts Official Shop December 25, 2019 release of "Seikai Series Complete Blu-ray BOX", "Separation of the Star World: Day of the Fall of Lakfakar" was recorded.

External links 
 

Crest of the Stars
2000 anime OVAs
2005 manga
Novels by Hiroyuki Morioka
Japanese serial novels
Bandai Entertainment anime titles
Funimation